Tai Wo Tsuen or Tai Wo Village, is the name of several villages in Hong Kong:

 Tai Wo Tsuen, Tai Po District, in Tai Po District
 Tai Wo Tsuen, Yuen Long District, in Pat Heung, Yuen Long District

See also
 Tai Wo Estate, a public housing estate in Tai Po